Laemanctus julioi, also known commonly as Julio's casquehead iguana, is a species of lizard in the family Corytophanidae. The species is endemic to Honduras.

Etymology
The specific name, julioi, is in honor of Honduran zoologist Julio Enrique Mérida.

Geographic range

Behavior
L. julioi is diurnal.

Reproduction
L. julioi is oviparous. Eggs are laid in May and June.

References

Further reading
Antúnez-Fonseca, Cristopher Alberto; Zúniga, Luis Gualberto; Padilla-Raudales, Denis; Vega-R., Hermes; Funes, Carlos (2021). "Extended range and observations on the natural history of the casquehead lizard Laemanctus julioi from Honduras". Herpetological Bulletin (156): 18–22.
McCranie JR (2018). "The Lizards, Crocodiles, and Turtles of Honduras. Systematics, Distribution, and Conservation". Bulletin of the Museum of Comparative Zoology (15): 1–129. (Laemanctus julioi, new species).

Laemanctus
Reptiles described in 2018
Taxa named by James Randall McCranie
Reptiles of Honduras